Sellero (locally ) is a comune of 1,503 people in the province of Brescia (far 83 km from Brescia) in the middle Val Camonica.

In its territory there are thousands of rock engravings, including the "Rosa camuna" in Carpene (which is the symbol of Lombardy region). In the commune's territory there are also examples of energy excellence, such as the San Fiorano's underground hydroelectric power (in Scianica) and a biomass tele-heating power.

The commune consists of the settlements of Sellero (the most important of the commune) and the frazione of Novelle. Another settlement is Scianica, situated in the valley floor and developed in the 1970s and 1980s.

Geography 

The commune is situated in the middle Val Camonica, on the right bank of the river Oglio. Neighbouring communes are Berzo Demo, Capo di Ponte, Cedegolo and Paisco Loveno. The highest point is Monte Elto, which is 2,145 metres high.

History
There are traces of Camunnic settlements around Sellero, dating back to the Bronze Age. During the Roman era, the area was sparsely populated. It was repopulated during the Middle Ages. Recently, from 1927 to 1948 the commune joined with Cedegolo, a neighbouring commune.

Population trends, 1861–2001 

Source: ISTAT

Interesting places 

The two churches of the town, the parish church (Saint Mary) and the ancient church (Saint Desiderio) present some interesting artistic works.

The parish church, finished in 1785, presents an interesting altar in Sicily's and Verona's marble and a portal in Vezza d'Oglio's marble. Also the ancient church, erected by Frankish, can be visited and presents some Pietro di Cemmo's frescos.

Near the frazione of Novelle there are the Carona's mines, which can be visited with equipment for speleology.

Economy 
Sellero, from 1950 to 1980, was an important industrial town in Valle Camonica, thank to the Scianica's little plain.

The first activity started in 1907 when the Curletti company began the utilization of Carona's mine for the sulphur's mining, and finished in 1951.

With the mines' utilization some people founded the SEFE (in English Society for the management of electric furnaces) which built three furnaces for the calcium carbide's production.

Now the first activity is an iron factory, Riva Acciaio (Riva Iron).

References

Cities and towns in Lombardy